The women's hammer throw event at the 2020 Summer Olympics took place on 1 and 3 August 2021 at the Japan National Stadium. Approximately 35 athletes competed; the exact number was dependent on how many nations use universality places to enter athletes in addition to the 32 qualifying through distance or ranking (no universality places were used in 2016).

Summary
Since 2009, the dominant name in women's hammer throwing has been Anita Włodarczyk. She holds the world record and the top six throws in history. She is the defending two time Olympic Champion and the 2017 World Champion. She underwent knee surgery and took much of the 2019 and 2020 seasons off. In her absence, DeAnna Price won in 2019. Until June 26 of this year, Włodarczyk was the only woman to throw beyond 80 metres. Price became the second at the US Trials. The other two American qualifiers had moved up to the top six women in history, Brooke Andersen to #5 just in April. During the 2021 season, Włodarczyk was not showing the same form, throwing in the low 70's and losing multiple competitions. Four days after Price hit 80, Włodarczyk finally showed she still could do it, getting a 77.93m in Bydgoszcz. Other strong competitors included Włodarczyk's Polish teammates; Malwina Kopron and Joanna Fiodorow, both of whom had World Championship medals; and three time World Championship medalist Wang Zheng.

Włodarczyk made short work of qualifying, reaching her second best throw of the year, 76.99m, one and done. The only other thrower to reach automatic qualifying on their first attempt was Camryn Rogers. Wang, Andersen and Alexandra Tavernier took two attempts to reach automatic. None of the other qualifiers even made automatic. 71.68 made the top 12 and into the finals.

The finals got off to a lackluster start, Tavernier coming out of the round with the lead at 73.54m. In the second, Rogers moved up with 74.35m, then Wang took over with 75.30m. That lead lasted until Włodarczyk threw next in the ring, 76.01m was the answer. The third round eliminated two Americans, Andersen and Gwen Berry, with Price barely qualifying in eighth. Włodarczyk improved to 77.44m. Kopron's fifth round 75.49m moved her into silver position. But Wang used her final effort to muscle out 77.03m to take the silver for good, leaving Kopron with the bronze. Three straight Olympic golds for Włodarczyk.

Background
This was the 6th appearance of the event, having appeared in every Summer Olympics since 2000.

Qualification

A National Olympic Committee (NOC) could enter up to 3 qualified athletes in the women's hammer throw event if all athletes meet the entry standard or qualify by ranking during the qualifying period. (The limit of 3 has been in place since the 1930 Olympic Congress.) The qualifying standard is 72.50 metres. This standard was "set for the sole purpose of qualifying athletes with exceptional performances unable to qualify through the IAAF World Rankings pathway." The world rankings, based on the average of the best five results for the athlete over the qualifying period and weighted by the importance of the meet, will then be used to qualify athletes until the cap of 32 is reached.

The qualifying period was originally from 1 May 2019 to 29 June 2020. Due to the COVID-19 pandemic, the period was suspended from 6 April 2020 to 30 November 2020, with the end date extended to 29 June 2021. The world rankings period start date was also changed from 1 May 2019 to 30 June 2020; athletes who had met the qualifying standard during that time were still qualified, but those using world rankings would not be able to count performances during that time. The qualifying time standards could be obtained in various meets during the given period that have the approval of the IAAF. Both outdoor and indoor meets are eligible. The most recent Area Championships may be counted in the ranking, even if not during the qualifying period.

NOCs can also use their universality place—each NOC can enter one female athlete regardless of time if they had no female athletes meeting the entry standard for an athletics event—in the hammer throw.

Competition format
The 2020 competition continued to use the two-round format with divided final introduced in 1936. The qualifying round gave each competitor three throws to achieve a qualifying distance (73.50 metres); if fewer than 12 women did so, the top 12 would advance. The final provided each thrower with three throws; the top eight throwers received an additional three throws for a total of six, with the best to count (qualifying round throws were not considered for the final).

Records
Prior to this competition, the existing world, Olympic, and area records were as follows.

Schedule
All times are Japan Standard Time (UTC+9)

The women's hammer throw took place over two separate days.

Results

Qualifying 
Qualification rules: Qualifying performance 73.50 (Q) or at least 12 best performers (q) advance to the final.

Final

References

Women's hammer throw
2020
Women's events at the 2020 Summer Olympics
Olympics